This is a list of Bien de Interés Cultural landmarks in the Province of Badajoz, Spain.

 Albarregas Roman bridge
 Badajoz Cathedral
 Dolmen del prado de Lácara
 Guadiana Roman bridge
 Monastery of San Isidro de Loriana
 Nuestra Señora de Gracia Parish Church
 Proserpina Dam
 San Lázaro Roman aqueduct

References 

 
Badajoz
History of Extremadura